Helend Peep (29 July 1910 – 20 October 2007), born Ernst-Helmut Peep, was an Estonian actor and singer, well known for his performance of "Kerjuse laul" in the musical Ainult unistus.

Peep was born in Vaikla and started his professional career in 1938 and created a long career in the Estonian language Vanemuine theatre of Tartu. He also had roles in several films.

Peep died on 20 October 2007, at the age of 97 years.

References

External links

1910 births
2007 deaths
Estonian male film actors
Estonian male stage actors
Estonian male musical theatre actors
20th-century Estonian male actors
20th-century Estonian male singers
Recipients of the Order of the White Star, 5th Class
People from Alutaguse Parish